Hemidactylus whitakeri, also known as Whitaker's termite hill gecko, is a species of house gecko from India.

References

Hemidactylus
Reptiles described in 2018
Reptiles of India
Endemic fauna of India